Lam Luk Ka is a district (amphoe) of Pathum Thani province, a part of Bangkok Metropolitan Region.

History
Originally, Lam Luk Ka was a vast grassland interspersed with scrubland and wetlands, as well as a habitat for various kinds of wildlife called "Thung Luang" (ทุ่งหลวง, "great field"). For the development of the country, King Chulalongkorn (Rama V) ordered the Khlong Rangsit to be cut through this area. The effect of having a canal for irrigation flowing through, as a result, more people migrated to live here.

The district had waterways flowing through it, confluence into the pond shaped like a crow's feet. Therefore attracting many species of birds to nest here because of the fertile pond. Locals therefore called "Bueng Lam Luk Ka", literally translated as "course of baby crow" or "ballard of baby crow" in another sense, included there are many crow sculptures adorn buildings and lampposts along the secondary highway through the city.

When the government formed the amphoe Lam Luk Ka in 1904, they cut the prefix "Bueng" (pond) off.

Geography
Lam Luk Ka is a southernmost part of the province.

Neighbouring districts are (from the north clockwise): Thanyaburi of Pathum Thani; Ongkharak of Nakhon Nayok province; Bang Nam Priao of Chachoengsao province; Nong Chok, Khlong Sam Wa, Sai Mai, and Don Mueang of Bangkok; and Mueang Pathum Thani.

Khlong Rangsit is the main water resource of the district.

Administration
The district is divided into eight subdistricts (tambons). There are three town municipalities (thesaban mueangs): Khu Khot, Lam Sam Kaeo, and Lat Sawai, and two subdistrict municipalities (thesaban tambons): Lam Luk Ka and Lam Sai. There are six subdistrict administrative organizations (SAO).

References

Lam Luk Ka